Bodo may refer to:

Ethnicity 
 Boro people, an ethno-linguistic group mainly from Northwest Assam, India
 Bodo-Kachari people, an umbrella group from Nepal, India and Bangladesh that includes the Bodo people

Culture and language 
 Boro culture, the culture of the Bodo people
 Boro language (India), spoken by the Boro people
 Bodo languages (disambiguation), a linguistic group of languages that includes the Boro language of India
 Bodo language (Bantu),  a possibly extinct Bantu language of the Central African Republic

Places 
 Bodó, a municipality in Rio Grande do Norte, Brazil
 Bodø, a city in Norway
 Bodo, Alberta, a hamlet in Canada
 Bodo, Cameroon, village of Far North Region, Cameroon
 Bodo, Chad, a sub-prefecture of Logone Occidental Region, Chad
 BoDo (district), a district of Boise, Idaho
 Bodo, Lacs, a village in Lacs District, Ivory Coast
 Bodo, Lagunes, a village in Lagunes District, Ivory Coast
 Bodo, a village in Balinț Commune, Timiș County, Romania

People 
 Bodo (deacon) (814–876), a Frankish deacon at the court of Emperor Louis the Pious
 Bodo (hypostrategos), a Carthaginian senator and naval officer
 Bodo (given name)
 Bodo (surname)

Science 
 Bodo (excavate), a genus of flagellate excavates
 Bodo cranium, the skull of an extinct type of hominin species
 Bodo saltans, the best-known species of the genus Bodo

Other uses 
 Bodo blouse, a sheer and transparent loose blouse 
 Bodø Airport (IATA: BOO, ICAO: ENBO), a civil airport in Bodø, Norway
 Bodø HK, a Norwegian handball team
 Bodo League massacre, killing incident in South Korea during the summer of 1950
 Bodó River, a river in Rio Grande do Norte, Brazil

See also
 Bodoland, proposed state of India
 Bodor, a surname

Language and nationality disambiguation pages